This is an alphabetical list of films produced in Mozambique.

0–9
 25 (1977)

A
 A Arvore dos Antepassados (1995)

B
 The Ball (2001)
 Banguza Timbila (1982)

C
 Canta Meu Irmao, Ajuda-Me a Cantar (1982)
 Capitalization (2011) - directed by Guido Brothers; produced by Peter P. Gudo 
 The Children's Republic (2010) - with Danny Glover and Peter P. Gudo
 Comédia Infantil (1998)

D
Dina (2010) - directed by Mickey Fonseca https://pro.imdb.com/company/co0443180?s=b0b3488f-66cc-07d5-6584-cde50670d015

F
 Fogata (1992)
 Frontières sanglantes (1987)
 Frutos Da Nossa Colheita (1984)

G
 O Gotejar da Luz (2002)
 A Guerra da Água (1995)

I
 I Love You (2007) - directed by Rogério Manjate

K
 Kuxa Kanema: The Birth of Cinema (2003)

L
 The Letter (2010) - directed by Michele Mathison https://pro.imdb.com/company/co0443180?s=b0b3488f-66cc-07d5-6584-cde50670d015
 Limpopo (1970)
 Lobolo (2010) - directed by Michele Mathison https://pro.imdb.com/company/co0443180?s=b0b3488f-66cc-07d5-6584-cde50670d015

M
 Mahla (2009) - directed by Mickey Fonseca https://www.imdb.com/title/tt3135416/https://pro.imdb.com/company/co0443180?s=b0b3488f-66cc-07d5-6584-cde50670d015
 Manungo (2007) - directed by Tony Magmar; starring Peter P. Gudo
 Maputo Mulher (1984)
 Mar de Crenca (1996)
 Marrabenta Stories (2004) - directed by Karen Boswall
 O meu marido esta a negar (2007) - directed by Rogério Manjate
 A Miner's Tale (2001)
 Mississe (1995) - by Pipas Forjaz
 Mueda, Memoria e Massacre (1980)
 Música, Moçambique! (1980)

N
 Nico: Maputo (2013) - produced by Peter P. Gudo
 Nos criancas Mocambicanas (1983)

P
 Pamberi ne Zimbabwe (1981)
 Poisoned Love (2010) - directed by Mickey Fonseca https://pro.imdb.com/company/co0443180?s=b0b3488f-66cc-07d5-6584-cde50670d015

S
 Samora Machel, Son of Africa (1989)
 Seremos Poetas
 Skipping Rope (1998)
 Street Wheels (1998)

T
 Tatana (2005)
 O Tempo dos Leopardos (1985)
 Terra Sonâmbula (2000)
 Traidos pela Traicão (2010) - directed by Mickey Fonseca https://pro.imdb.com/company/co0443180?s=b0b3488f-66cc-07d5-6584-cde50670d015
 The Train of Salt and Sugar (2016)

V
 O Vento Sopra do Norte (1987)
 Vreme leoparda (1985)

References

External links
 Mozambican film at the Internet Movie Database

Mozambique